Thelma Dorfman Sullivan (18 August 1918—11 August 1981) was an American paleographer, linguist and translator, regarded as one of the foremost scholars in the 20th century of the Classical Nahuatl language. Significant works include a compendium of Nahuatl grammar (1976), noted as the most comprehensive treatment of its day, and her translation of Bernardino de Sahagún's 16th-century text known as the Primeros Memoriales, completed by colleagues after her death.

References

 
 
 
 

Linguists from the United States
Women linguists
American Mesoamericanists
Women Mesoamericanists
20th-century Mesoamericanists
Linguists of Mesoamerican languages
Translators from Nahuatl
1918 births
1981 deaths
20th-century translators
Linguists of Uto-Aztecan languages